Kiidjärv is a lake in Põlva Parish, Põlva County, in southeastern Estonia.

See also
List of lakes of Estonia

Lakes of Estonia
Põlva Parish
Lakes of Põlva County
Tourist attractions in Põlva County